Avalere Health, a part of Fishawack Health, is a health care business consulting firm headquartered in Washington, D.C., that serves clients across the healthcare industry specializing in strategy, policy, and data analysis for life sciences, health plans, and providers. Avalere’s industry experts use proprietary data to help clients anticipate change, quantify opportunity, support growth, and make data-driven business decisions. The company also publishes research studies on health care issues and the health care reform debate in the United States.

History

Avalere was founded as The Health Strategies Consultancy LLC in 2000 by Dan Mendelson. The company was renamed Avalere Health in 2005, and in 2008 Mendelson sold a minority interest to ABS Capital Partners, a Baltimore, Maryland–based private equity firm. On September 1, 2015, Inovalon (Nasdaq: INOV), a leading technology company headquartered in Bowie, Maryland, providing an integrated cloud-based platform that enables healthcare organizations to implement large-scale highly sophisticated data-driven initiatives, acquired Avalere Health. Avalere operated as a subsidiary with a focus on providing advisory services on market consolidation, cost management, quality improvement, and managed care as well as business intelligence and corporate communication strategies. The firm has also published studies on drug plan coverage and managed care plans in the US. Avalere was acquired by Fishawack Health in June 2022.

References

Further reading
  (Report to the Council for Affordable Health Coverage)

External links 
 

2000 establishments in Washington, D.C.
American companies established in 2000
Companies based in Washington, D.C.
Consulting firms established in 2000
Health care management